The Port of Latakia is a seaport located on the Mediterranean sea in the city of Latakia. Established on 12 February 1950, it has since served as Syria's main seaport.

Its imported cargo include clothing, construction materials, vehicles, furniture, minerals, tobacco, cotton, and food supplies such as lentils, onions, wheat, barley, dates, grains and figs, and in 2008 the port handled about 8 million tons of cargo.

The port is also a link in six organized cruises between Alexandria, İzmir and Beirut. In addition, there are irregular ferry services to Cyprus. In 2005, approximately 27,939 passengers used the port.

History
The port of Latakia is connected to the history of settlement in this region. Since the early Roman Empire, a port is operated at this landmark. In 1945 Syria became independent and the port of Latakia was at these times the only seaport in the country. The export of cotton was handled by this port. In 1971, 1.6 million tons of cargo were loaded in the port, after the expansion in 1981, it was over twice as much: 3.6 million tons.

Today, petroleum products such as bitumen and asphalt are exported via the port, as well as grain, cotton, vegetable oil and tobacco ("Latakia tobacco").

The embargo on Syria in response to Assad's conduct in the Syrian civil war has also affected the transshipment in the port of Latakia since 2011. Since 2019, Iran leases parts of the port of Latakia for civilian and military use. This was followed closely by Russia, which operates its only naval base in the Mediterranean in nearby Tartus. Observers see the treaty with Iran as the attempt of a partially economically isolated country to gain access to the Mediterranean.

On 28 December 2021, shortly before dawn, the Israeli Air Force struck the port, causing heavy damage to a number of shipping containers. The site was also targeted by Israel a few weeks earlier on 7 December. An anonymous source claimed the containers were carrying weapons from Iran. According to SANA, the missile attack also wrecked the facades of a hospital, some residential buildings, and shops. The blaze was brought under control and no casualties were reported by Syrian authorities.

General statistics

* figures in millions of tonnes

References

Bibliography

.
.
.

Latakia
Buildings and structures in Latakia
Latakia
Transport in the Arab League